Kenneth Michael Hays (born October 18, 1952) is an American architectural historian and professor.  He currently serves as Eliot Noyes Professor of Architectural Theory at Harvard University's Graduate School of Design.  He is also co-director of the school's doctoral programs, namely Ph.D and DDes or Doctor of Design.

Education
Hays received his B.Arch degree from the Georgia Institute of Technology in 1976. He then went on to the Massachusetts Institute of Technology's School of Architecture and Planning, where he received his M.Arch in Advanced Studies in the History and Theory of Architecture in 1979.  His dissertation was entitled Reference, Coherence, Meaning: A Realist Epistemology of Art under the direction of Henry A. Millon.  In 1990, he completed his Ph.D program at MIT School of Architecture and Planning in the History, Theory, and Criticism of Architecture and Art.  His main focus of study was European Modernism and his minor field was critical theory.  His dissertation was advised by Stanford Anderson and he wrote on Modernism and the Posthumanist Subject: The Architecture of Hannes Meyer and Ludwig Hilberseimer, which he later published into a book of the same title.

Career
Hays has played a central role in the development of architectural theory, which has gained him international renown. His research and scholarship have focused on the areas of European modernism and critical theory, as well as on theoretical issues of contemporary architectural practice. He has published on the work of modern architects such as Hannes Meyer, Ludwig Hilberseimer, and Mies van der Rohe, as well as on contemporary figures such as Peter Eisenman, Bernard Tschumi, and the late John Hejduk.

Hays was the founder of the scholarly architecture journal Assemblage, which was a leading forum in discussion of architectural theory in both North America and Europe.

From 1995 through 2005, he was Chair of the Ph.D. Committee and director of the Harvard Graduate School of Design's Advanced Independent Study Program. In 2000, he was appointed the first Adjunct Curator of Architecture at the Whitney Museum of American Art, a position he held until 2009.

Personal life
Hays resides in Boston, Massachusetts with his wife, Martha Pilgreen, who is also an architect and president of Perry Dean Rogers Architects. They have one son, Henry.

Works
Modernism and the Posthumanist Subject: The Architecture of Hannes Meyer and Ludwig Hilberseimer (1992) 
Unprecedented Realism: The Architecture of Machado and Silvetti (1995) 
Hejduk's Chronotope (1996) 
Oppositions Reader: Selected Essays 1973-1984 (1998)  
Architecture Theory Since 1968 (2000) 
 Introduction of The Singular Objects of Architecture (by Jean Baudrillard and Jean Nouvel) (2002) 
Sanctuaries: The Last Works of John Hejduk, with Maxwell L. Anderson, John Hejduk, Toshiko Mori (2002) 
Scanning: The Aberrant Architectures of Diller + Scofidio, with Aaron Betsky and Laurie Anderson (2003) 
Tschumi, with Giovanni Damiani and Marco De Michelis (2003) 
Buckminster Fuller: Starting with the Universe, with Dana A. Miller (2008) 
Architecture's Desire: Reading the Late Avant-Garde (2010) 
Constructing a New Agenda: Architectural Theory 1993-2009 (2010) 
Log 22, with numerous authors (2010)

References

External links 

 
Harvard Graduate School of Design profile

1952 births
Living people
20th-century American architects
American architectural historians
American male non-fiction writers
Georgia Tech alumni
MIT School of Architecture and Planning alumni
Harvard Graduate School of Design faculty

Architectural theoreticians
21st-century American architects